NWA 11789 (also Buagaba) is a Lunar meteorite that was found in the country of Mauritania. It has been broken into six fragments, which can be reassembled like a puzzle. For this reason, the meteorite is also known as The Moon Puzzle.

Description
The six black pieces of the meteorite fit together to form a larger meteorite, weighing . The larger pieces show a black-brown partial fusion crust, caused by the heat generated as the meteorite descended through earth's atmosphere. The large pieces also show thumb printing. Internally, the breccia is fragmented, with white clasts of feldspar set in a black ground mass.

Ownership
From 20172018, the meteorite was held by meteorite curator Dustin Dickens, who purchased it from an anonymous meteorite hunter in Mauritania.

An auction was held by Boston-based RR Auction in October 2018, with the opening bid at $50,000. The auction closed on 19 October, with the winning bid of $612,500 awarded to Tam Chúc Pagoda complex, of Vietnam.

See also
 List of lunar meteorites
List of Martian meteorites
 Moon rocks

References

 
Meteorites found in Mauritania